Tamaz Arkadyevich Topuriya (born 29 January 2002) is a Russian football player of Georgian descent. He plays for FC SKA Rostov-on-Don.

Club career
He made his debut in the Russian Premier League for FC Rostov on 19 June 2020 in a game against PFC Sochi. FC Rostov was forced to field their Under-18 squad in that game as their main squad was quarantined after 6 players tested positive for COVID-19.

On 27 August 2021, he joined FC SKA Rostov-on-Don on loan.

References

External links
 
 
 

2002 births
Russian people of Georgian descent
Living people
Russian footballers
Association football forwards
FC Rostov players
FC SKA Rostov-on-Don players
Russian Premier League players